"Before I Die" was an American television film broadcast on January 23, 1958, as part of the CBS television series, Playhouse 90. It aired as the 20th episode of the second season.

Plot
A surgeon becomes convinced of the innocence of a convicted murderer based on the convict mumbling while under anesthesia. He risks his reputation to save the convict from the electric chair.

Cast
The cast included performances by:
 Richard Kiley as Dr. David Del Vecchio
 Kim Hunter as Joyce McClure
 Skip Homeier as George Weaver
 Coleen Gray as Carol Dennison
 Jay C. Flippen as Lester Carr
 Joe De Santis as Dr. Max Bronstein
 John Hoyt as Dr. Gordon Harper
 Dayton Lummis as Dr. Engle
 Fred Eisley as Anesthetist

Production
Arthur Hiller was the director and William Froug the producer. Berne Giler wrote the script based on a story by William Sackheim and Daniel B. Ullman. Gert Andersen was the director of photography and Richard Brockway the editor. The film was produced by Screen Gems for Playhouse 90.

References

1958 American television episodes
Playhouse 90 (season 2) episodes
1958 television plays